Atanas Stoimenov (Bulgarian: Атанас Стоименов; born 25 September 2002) is a Bulgarian footballer who plays as a midfielder for Botev Plovdiv II.

Career statistics

Club

References

External links
 

2002 births
Living people
Bulgarian footballers
Association football midfielders
First Professional Football League (Bulgaria) players
Second Professional Football League (Bulgaria) players
Botev Plovdiv players
FC Yantra Gabrovo players
Sportspeople from Pazardzhik